Adam and Evil is a 1927 American silent comedy film directed by Robert Z. Leonard and written by F. Hugh Herbert, Florence Ryerson and Ralph Spence. The film stars Lew Cody, Aileen Pringle, Gwen Lee, Gertrude Short, Hedda Hopper, and Roy D'Arcy. The film was released on August 27, 1927, by Metro-Goldwyn-Mayer.

Premise
"The little fur-bearing animals that are sacrificed for the vanity of women desiring fur coats have a posthumous revenge."

Cast 
Lew Cody as Adam Trevelyan / Allan Trevelyan
Aileen Pringle as Evelyn Trevelyan
Gwen Lee as Gwen De Vere
Gertrude Short as Dora Dell
Hedda Hopper as Eleanor Leighton
Roy D'Arcy	as Mortimer Jenkins

Preservation status
With no copies listed in any film archives, Adam and Evil is currently a lost film.

References

External links

1927 films
1920s English-language films
Silent American comedy films
1927 comedy films
Metro-Goldwyn-Mayer films
Films directed by Robert Z. Leonard
American black-and-white films
American silent feature films
Lost American films
1927 lost films
Lost comedy films
Films with screenplays by Florence Ryerson
Films with screenplays by F. Hugh Herbert
1920s American films